Amanda Celine Miller  is an American voice actress in audiobooks, commercials, English dubs for anime, animation and video games. Her major roles include Sailor Jupiter, in the Viz Media re-dub of the classic Sailor Moon series and the new Sailor Moon Crystal series, Junko Enoshima and Toko Fukawa in the Danganronpa video game series, Sully and Cherche in Fire Emblem Awakening, Takeru Aizawa in Squid Girl, and Boruto Uzumaki in Boruto: Naruto Next Generations. She was selected as the Breakthrough Actress of the Year by Behind The Voice Actors in their annual Dub Anime Awards for 2014.

Career 
Makoto Kino, otherwise known as Sailor Jupiter, is arguably one of Amanda C. Miller's most notable roles. A longtime Sailor Moon fan, Miller auditioned for every female part in the series, but became ecstatic when she discovered that she was cast as Sailor Jupiter. Miller cites Sailor Jupiter as her favorite character. On describing the similarities between her and Sailor Jupiter, Miller said, "I’m a lot like Makoto, because we were both the tallest kid in our class. I was, like, 5’7” when I was in fifth grade ... I did play hockey on a boys’ team. I played goalie. So, I think that I have the tomboy aspect—and I love green—but also what I love about the character is that she was very tough but she was also equally as feminine. She was just so ‘I like to ice skate, I like to nerd out over cute boys,’ and I just love that about her. I think we both share that. Like we’re both feminine, but we'll also kick your butt." Miller cited actor Harvey Fierstein as an influence to voicing Makoto.

Filmography

Anime

Animation

Films

Video games

References

External links
 
 
 
 
 Amanda C. Miller 2013 interview and 2014 interview on 91.8 the Fan

African-American actresses
American voice actresses
American video game actresses
Living people
Year of birth missing (living people)
German emigrants to the United States
21st-century American actresses
21st-century African-American women
21st-century African-American people